Mardarije is masculine given name. Notable people with Mardarije given name include:

 Hieromonk Mardarije - a 16th-century Serbian Orthodox hieromonk and one of the most important early Serb printers
 Hegumen Mardarije (fl. 1543–45) - a Serbian Orthodox monk and one of the first printers of Serbian language books
 Mardarije Kornečanin (fl. 1625–59) was the Serbian Orthodox Metropolitan (vladika) of Cetinje from 1637 to 1659, who after 1640 entered union with the Papacy